Annai is an Amerindian village in the Upper Takutu-Upper Essequibo Region of Guyana.

Annai stands at an altitude of 95 metres (314 feet), at the edge of the Rupununi savannah, where the cattle trail to the Atlantic coast begins. It is nestled in the foothills of the Pakaraima Mountains, and is close to the Rupununi River.

Much of the population of the area are members of the Macushi people.  Annai is one of the northernmost Macushi Amerindian villages in the North Rupununi Savannahs. It is mainly an agriculture community living on cassava and peanut farming, and cattle ranching. Electricity is provided by solar power. Public services include a nursery, primary, and secondary school as well as a public health centre. Annai's airstrip (NAI) allows light planes to land.

Annai is home to the Rock View Ecotourism Resort, an old ranch built in the 1950s. Rock View is a good base for trips to the Iwokrama International Centre for Rain Forest Conservation and Development.

Kwatamang is a satellite village of Annai that was settled in 1948, and a school was built there in 1990.

References

Indigenous villages in Guyana
Populated places in Upper Takutu-Upper Essequibo